Herpetogramma brunnealis is a moth in the family Crambidae. It was described by George Hampson in 1913. It is found on Mayotte and Réunion and in Ghana, Madagascar and Nigeria.

References

Moths described in 1913
Herpetogramma
Moths of Africa